Llandaff Cathedral is an Anglican cathedral and parish church in Llandaff, Cardiff, Wales. It is the seat of the Bishop of Llandaff, head of the Church in Wales Diocese of Llandaff. It is dedicated to Saint Peter and Saint Paul, and three Welsh saints: Dubricius, Teilo and Oudoceus. It is one of two cathedrals in Cardiff, the other being the Roman Catholic Cardiff Metropolitan Cathedral in the city centre.

The current building was constructed in the 12th century on the site of an earlier church. Severe damage was done to the church in 1400 during the rebellion of Owain Glyndŵr, during the English Civil War when it was overrun by Parliamentarian troops, and during the Great Storm of 1703. By 1717, the damage to the cathedral was so extensive that the church seriously considered the removal of the see. Following further storms in the early 1720s, construction of a new cathedral began in 1734, designed by John Wood, the Elder. During the Cardiff Blitz of the Second World War in January 1941, the cathedral was severely damaged when a parachute mine was dropped; blowing the roof off the nave, south aisle and chapter house. The stonework which remains from the medieval period is primarily Dundry stone from Somerset, though local blue lias constitutes most of the stonework done in the post-Reformation period. The work done on the church since World War II is primarily concrete and Pennant sandstone, and the roofs, of Welsh slate and lead, were added during the post-war rebuilding. In February 2007, the organ was damaged during a severe lightning strike, following which there was a successful appeal for £1.5 million for an entirely new organ.

For many years, the cathedral had the traditional Anglican choir of boys and men, and more recently a girls' choir, with the only dedicated choir school in the Church in Wales, the Cathedral School, Llandaff. The cathedral contains a number of notable tombs, including Dubricius, a 6th-century British saint who evangelised Ergyng (now Archenfield) and much of South-East Wales, Meurig ap Tewdrig, King of Gwent, Teilo, a 6th-century Welsh clergyman, church founder and saint, and many Bishops of Llandaff, from the 7th century Oudoceus to the 19th century Alfred Ollivant, who was bishop from 1849 to 1882.

History

Legendary origins

There is common consensus that the Norman cathedral was constructed on the site of an ancient Celtic church, but there is little consensus on the original church's age, importance or size.

Lucius of Britain 
Welsh tradition associates the church's founding with Lucius, the legendary 2nd century King of the Britons and the first Christian convert in Britain. Lucius was believed to have beseeched the Pope (Eleutherius) to convert him to Christianity. The Pope's response was to send a Christian mission to Britain, which would include the building of Britain's first church. The Welsh Triads relate this tradition to Llandaff, stating that Lucius "made the first Church at Llandaf, which was the first in the Isle of Britain." another triad lists ""the three archbishoprics of the Isle of Britain" and states that "the first was Llandaf, of the gift of Lleirwg (Lucius), the son of Coel, the son of Cyllin, who first gave lands and civil privileges to such as first embraced the faith in Christ." Although the Lucius legend is now considered to be pseudohistory, it was recounted by Nennius, Bede and Geoffrey of Monmouth, and seems to have been widely accepted in the medieval period.

Four names are associated with the task of executing the Pope's wishes, these include the early Welsh saints Fagan, Deruvian and Elvan. Fagan is sometimes named as "the first Bishop of Llandaff" while all three became patrons of churches and villages throughout the diocese. Iolo Morgannwg also linked these early figures to Llandaff, writing extensively on this supposed early foundation. In the Iolo Manuscripts, he credits Fagan as the second Bishop of Llandaff (succeeding Dyfan, a figure Iolo conflates with Deruvian).

Saint Dubricius 

In their writings on Lucius of Britain, both Geoffrey of Monmouth and Iolo Morganwg would state that the original Christian community at Llandaff was re-established by Saint Dyfrig (Dubricius) and his successor Saint Teilo. The most notable legends surrounding these two would state that Saint Dyfrig was made Archbishop by Saint Germanus of Auxerre while he travelled through Britain to oppose the Pelagian heresy, and linked both saints with King Arthur.

The Normans considered Dyfrig and Teilo as the cathedral's founders and they, along with their successor Oudoceus, are the modern Cathedral's patron saints. The continuation of a Post-Roman church is supported by the high number of ancient remains at the site (most notably an ancient Celtic cross at the Bishop's Court's well) and both secular and ecclesiastical writings.

Norman cathedral
The Normans occupied Glamorgan early in the Norman conquest, appointing Urban their first bishop in 1107. He began construction of the cathedral in 1120 and had the remains of Saint Dyfrig transferred from Bardsey.  After the death of Urban, it is believed the work was completed some time in the last years of Bishop Nicholas ap Gwrgant, who died in 1183. The cathedral was dedicated to Saints Peter and Paul, Dubricius, Teilo and Oudoceus.

Bishop Henry de Abergavenny organised the Llandaff Cathedral chapter circa 1214. He appointed fourteen prebends, eight priests, four deacons and two sub-deacons. De Abergavenny also made changes to Llandaff's episcopal seal, giving more detail to the figure of the bishop depicted on it and adding the phrase "by the grace of God" to its inscription. The west front dates from 1220 and contains a statue of St Teilo. By 1266, the structure that Urban began had been altered; the cathedral was dedicated again in 1266.

The Lady Chapel was built by William de Braose, bishop from 1266 to 1287. It was built at the rear of the church constructed by Urban and the old choir area was removed in order to build the chapel. From this time on, it seemed as if the cathedral was in a constant state of repair or alterations at a slow pace. After the Lady Chapel had been completed, the two bays of the north choir aisle were rebuilt.

Severe damage was done to the church in 1400 during the rebellion of Owain Glyndŵr; his forces also destroyed the Bishop's Palace at Llandaff. The damage was extensive enough to cause Bishop Blethyn to notify his fellow clergymen in 1575 that he believed the cathedral to possibly be damaged beyond repair. Most of the other damage was repaired, most notably by Bishop Marshall, whose reredos partly survives. The northwest tower, the one without a spire, was added by Jasper Tudor and is now named after him. He assumed the lordship of Cardiff after the accession to the throne of his nephew, King Henry VII of England.

Late medieval tombs include that of Sir David Mathew of Llandaff (1400–1484). Sir David ap Mathew was appointed "Grand Standard Bearer of England", by King Edward IV, for saving his life at the Battle of Towton 1461 as part of the War of the Roses.

Post-medieval to Victorian period

During the English Civil War, the cathedral was overrun by Parliamentarian troops. Along with other destruction, the troops seized the books of the cathedral library, taking them to Cardiff Castle, where they were burned along with many copies of the Book of Common Prayer. Among those invited to the castle to warm themselves by the fire on that cold winter day, were the wives of some sequestered clergymen. Also during this time of unrest, a man named Milles, who claimed to be a practising Puritan, appropriated portions of the cathedral for his own gain. Milles set up a tavern in the cathedral, used part of it as a stable, turned the choir area into a pen for his calves and used the font as a trough for his pigs.

The southwest tower suffered major damage in the Great Storm of 1703 and by 1720, was in a state of collapse. The damage to the cathedral was so extensive that the church seriously considered removal of the see to Cardiff in 1717. Between 1720 and 1723 a series of storms proceeded to damage the cathedral further, bringing down sections of the roof as well as other destruction. The collapse of 1723 forced worship services to be confined to the Lady Chapel and closed the western entrance of the cathedral entirely. 

Thirty years after the cathedral roof collapsed, the chapter asked an architect, John Wood, the Elder, to prepare estimates and plans to restore the cathedral. In 1734 work began on a new cathedral, designed by Wood. Wood produced an Italian temple style edifice, working only on the eastern portion of the building, while leaving the remaining western half in ruins. What Wood was trying to build at Llandaff was not Italian, but a recreation of Solomon's Temple.  Another sixteen years passed before the chapter solicited funds to repair the western half of the building. Wood's plans were to replace the western entrance of the cathedral with a tower and rustic porch. No changes were made to the western entrance until Wyatt and Prichard began their work in 1841, when the damage to the western portion of the structure was repaired and all traces of the Italian temple work by Wood had been removed from the cathedral.

During the 19th century the bishop began to reside in Llandaff for the first time in centuries; no bishops of the see resided in Llandaff for almost 300 years. In 1836 there was another unsuccessful attempt to transfer the see—this time to Bristol. After the attempt at transferring the see, the office of Dean was restored to Llandaff; the position had not been filled in 700 years. The office of Dean was separated from that of the Archdeacon of Llandaff in November 1843. The restoration of the Dean's office was the beginning of better times for the cathedral. The new Dean, William Bruce Knight, was instrumental in bringing about the much-needed restorations.

Enough restoration had been completed to allow the cathedral to be reopened for worship on 16 April 1857. The see of Gloucester lent their cathedral choir for this service, making it possible to hear choral music in Llandaff Cathedral for the first time since 1691. The restoration done up to this point was to remove all traces of the Italian temple and to repair damages caused by the attempt to transform the cathedral by Wood.  Arches with beautiful moulding were hidden by walls, Sedilia were removed from their original positions and reredos had been covered with plaster or hidden with walls.

A meeting was held after the service and a detailed restoration plan was announced at the meeting along with a list for those wishing to donate to the work. The Prince of Wales (later Edward VII) and John Crichton-Stuart, 3rd Marquess of Bute were among those who pledged donations sufficient to allow the restoration work to continue immediately. The cathedral was extensively restored, the tower rebuilt and a spire added. Much of the restoration work was completed by local architect John Prichard between 1843 and 1869. A triptych by Dante Gabriel Rossetti was designed for use as a reredos, and a new stained glass window, Shipwreck of St Paul, was designed by Ford Madox Brown. Sir Edward Burne-Jones designed the porcelain panels Six Days of Creation in St Dyfrig's Chapel.

From 1691 until around 1860 there had been no choir at the cathedral. There was also no organ for some time. Browne Willis' 1719 account describes the ruins of an organ given to the cathedral by Lady Kemysh of Cefn Mably found in the organ loft at that time. In 1860, Alfred Ollivant, who was then Bishop of Landaff, published a book, Some Account of the Condition of the Fabric of Llandaff Cathedral, from 1575 to the present time, intended to raise funds to restore the cathedral's choir and to purchase a new organ.
A cathedral school of some type has existed since the 9th century. Dean Vaughan reorganised the school in 1888. Since 1978 the cathedral school has accepted female pupils.

20th and 21st centuries

On the evening of 2 January 1941 during the Second World War, a parachute mine was dropped near it during the Cardiff Blitz. When it exploded, it blew the roof off the nave, south aisle and chapter house. The top of the spire also had to be reconstructed and there was also some damage to the organ. The Sunday after the bombing, worship took place in the Deanery. Work soon began to clear the Lady Chapel and the Sanctuary and to repair the roof in these areas. This was not completed until April 1942. Further work was not possible until the end of the war and the repaired areas served as a place of worship until 1957. Of British cathedrals, only Coventry Cathedral was damaged more, during the infamous Coventry Blitz. Due to its importance, it received Grade I building status on 12 February 1952.

Major restorations and reconfigurations were carried out under architect George Pace of York, and the building was back in use in June 1958. Elizabeth II attended a service celebrating the completion of the restoration on 6 August 1960. The Welch Regiment Memorial Chapel was constructed, and Jacob Epstein created the figure of Christ in Majesty which is raised above the nave on a concrete arch designed by George Pace.

Pace presented two options to replace the pulpitum which was not part of the cathedral restoration done earlier by Pritchard. One was for a baldacchino having four columns with a suitable painting beneath it. The other was for a double wishbone arch topped by a hollow drum to house the division of the organ. The figure of "Christ in Glory" would be installed on the west face of the drum. This proposal was accepted by the Dean and the cathedral chapter. They approached the War Damage Commission about whether funds initially meant for replacement of stained glass damaged in the bombing could be used for art in other media. This permission helped to finance the Majestas figure.

In February 2007 the cathedral suffered a severe lightning strike. Particular damage was caused to the electrics of the organ, which was already in poor condition. The instrument was not able to be used after the lightning damage. This prompted the 2007 launch of an appeal to raise £1.5 million for the construction of an entirely new organ.

Architecture

Construction began of a grander building under the orders of the second Norman bishop of Llandaff, Urban, in the 1120s, to administer power over the newly formed diocese. It doesn't appear to have lasted long as an extensive construction was ordered between 1193 and 1218 during the episcopate of Henry of Abergavenny. The western parts replaced those that Urban had built, and the nave and front of this side remain today. The fine craftsmanship and subtlety of the architecture show a clear similarity to those of Glastonbury Abbey and Wells Cathedral, so it is probable that several of the leading craftsman of Somerset were hired for the building.

Though some remodeling work was done in the 13th and 14th centuries, with a northwest tower funded by Jasper Tudor, lord of Glamorgan from 1484 to 1495, by the late 16th century the church had fallen into a state of disrepair. In 1594 the bishop complained that the cathedral was "more like a desolate and profane place than like a house of prayer and holy exercises". The church continued to exist in a poor state, so that by 1692 choral services had to be suspended in fear that the roof would collapse. The battlements of the northwestern tower blew away during a storm in 1703, and the southwest tower fell down in 1722. In 1734, John Wood of Bath was hired to restore the cathedral, but his work on the temple was still not complete by 1752 and remained that way.  It was not until 1840 that in the wake of industrial development in Cardiff that the cathedral could raise the funds to commence a full restoration.

T. H. Wyatt was hired to restore the Lady Chapel in 1841, but due to other commitments later left much of the work to John Prichard, who worked the most extensively on the church in the 1840s and 1850s. Prichard had restored the sanctuary by 1850, and by 1852 he had begun to work on the nave, largely demolishing much of the temple Wood had built.  Together with London-based John Pollard Seddon, who was able to hire pre-Raphaelite artists Dante Gabriel Rossetti and Thomas Woolner, extensive developments were made. Morris & Co. provided the stained glass in the 1860s. Prichard was responsible for a dramatic redevelopment of the southwest tower in 1867–1869, aided by a number of talented artists and craftsmen.

In 1941, a parachute mine exploded near the south aisle of the cathedral, resulting in the roof of the nave collapsing and the shattering of the windows. Charles Nicholson was hired to rebuild the roof, and made the decision to remove the altarpiece that Rossetti had added to the north aisle. In 1949, Nicholson was replaced with George Pace of York, who in coordination with the dean at the time, Glyn Simon, saw a number of improvements in the modern style, though many fittings were clearly still influenced by the Gothic.

The material of the church which remains from the medieval period is primarily Somerset Dundry stone, though Sutton stone and local blue lias also make up the stonework, with the latter constituting most of the stonework done in the post-Reformation period. The work done on the church since World War II is primarily concrete and Pennant sandstone. The roofs, added in the post-war period, are made of Welsh slate and lead. The West front of the cathedral is gabled along its length and contains the grand central doorway, higher in level than the floor of the nave. It is described as being "double lobed" with an "arched head with continuous chamfer outline, colonnettes and dripmould".

The south side of the nave is characterized by eight bays with stepped buttresses between them, with aisle windows featuring reticulated heads. At the side of the south aisle of the sanctuary is Chapter House, a small, two-story square building. It dates to the mid 13th century and is made from Chipping Camden and Bath limestone, with some local red sandstone from Radyr. The octagonal roof was the brainchild of Prichard, though it was lowered in pitch by Pace and later worked on by Donald Buttress. The buttresses of the building are made from ashlar. The seven stained-glass roundels are of 16th-century Flemish origin. In the interior is a pulpit featuring Moses. Also of note is the St David's Chapel, added by George Pace in 1953–1956, which is accessed through the Norman north door of the cathedral.

Chapter
, the Chapter — the governing body of the cathedral — consists of:

The Dean and Canons, the everyday clergy of the church:
Dean of Llandaff — Richard Peers (since 20 November 2022 installation)
Canon Precentor — Mark Preece (since 10 February 2019 installation)
Canon Chancellor — Jan van der Lely (since 5 May 2019 installation)
Chapter Canons (clergy): Steven Kirk; and Michael Komor, Archdeacon of Margam
Lay Canons: Gerard Elias KC; Ceri Weatherall; and Paul Bennett
Chapter Treasurer: Robert Lewis

Music

Choirs 
For many years, the cathedral had the traditional Anglican choir of boys and men, and more recently the Girl Choristers. The boys and girls are educated at the Cathedral School, the only dedicated choir school in the Church in Wales, .

The Cathedral Choir consists of boys and alto, tenor and bass parts, and sing on Sundays at the Choral Eucharist and at Choral Evensong. The full choir also sings on Thursdays for Evensong, with the boys singing alone on Tuesdays and the lower voices on Fridays. The Girl Choristers and Schola Cantorum keep the choral tradition going through the week, with full SATB services for Evensong on Mondays and Wednesdays, directed by the Master of Choristers of the Cathedral School. The Girl Choristers occasionally sing with the Cathedral Choir, and have sung at large services, including a National Service of Remembrance, on Remembrance Sunday in 2018.

In addition, the parish choir sings at the weekly Parish Eucharist, and is a mixed choir of boys, girls, men and women. The cathedral has a ring of twelve bells (with an additional "flat sixth", to make thirteen in total) hung for change-ringing, located in the Jasper tower. The current bells were installed in 1992, replacing a previous ring of ten. Only one other church in Wales has a ring of twelve bells; the cathedral is the only church in Cardiff with a set of twelve bells.

In December 2013, five days before Christmas, the cathedral chapter announced that all salaried adult members of the choir (altos, tenors and basses) were being made redundant, along with the assistant organist. The cathedral was in the midst of a financial crisis, and the chapter intended to save £45,000 a year by taking these measures.

Recordings 
In 2012 the cathedral premiered its own record label, with a recording called Majestas. The music focuses on the new cathedral organ and the Llandaff Cathedral choir. The recording's title was taken from the Jacob Epstein sculpture in the cathedral's nave that was part of the post-war renewal of the structure. Proceeds from sales of the record were donated to African charities.

In August 2018, a recording of the 2010–13 Nicholson Organ was released. The organ is played by the Director of Music, Stephen Moore, and is called Deo Gracias.

In December 2018, the cathedral launched a recording of its Cathedral Choir called Nadolig yn Llandaf, showcasing seasonal music for Advent to Christmas. This was the first CD of the cathedral's choir since Majestas in 2012.

Organs

Main Organs 
The first organ at Llandaff was built in 1861 by Gray and Davison. In the late 1800s, this organ was antiquated, and its pipes were moved to St. Mary's Church, Usk.

The second organ was built in 1900 by Hope-Jones with Norman and Beard. This organ was rebuilt in 1937 by Hill, Norman and Beard. It received significant renovations by its builders after wartime damage to the cathedral; it was never entirely satisfactory from this point onwards, even before a 2007 lightning strike made it unusable. Originally it had been planned to install a new organ at that time, but the costs of about £1,000,000 were deemed to be too high in the austere climate of post-war Britain.

Organ manufacturer Nicholson & Co Ltd began installation of a new organ in autumn 2008 and although not fully completed, it was brought to a playable stage by Easter 2010. Its inaugural performance was the Gloria of Louis Vierne's Messe solennelle, performed at the Easter Vigil service on 3 April 2010. Proceeds from the 2011 Llandaff Festival of Music were donated to the cathedral for the completion of the new organ. The remaining stops were added in the late summer of 2013. It was the first entirely new organ for a British cathedral since the Coventry installation in the 1960s.

Lady Chapel Organs 
Two chamber organs have been used in the Lady Chapel at the east end of the cathedral. The first, built in 1946 by Hill, Norman and Beard, had two manuals and pedals. This was replaced in 1960 with a single manual chamber organ built by Henry Willis & Sons, which remains there today.

Burials

 Dubricius, 6th-century saint who evangelised Ergyng (now Archenfield) and much of South-East Wales; his body was transferred to Llandaff Cathedral in 1120
 Teilo, 6th-century clergyman, church founder and saint
 Henry de Abergavenny, Bishop of Llandaff (1193–1218)
 William de Braose, Bishop of Llandaff (1266–1287)
 John of Monmouth, Bishop of Llandaff (1297–1323)
 Edmund de Bromfield, Bishop of Llandaff (1390–1393)
 John Paschal, Bishop of Llandaff (1347–1361)
 John Smith, Bishop of Llandaff (1476–1478)
 Sir David Mathew, (1400–1484), born Dafydd ap Mathew, was Lord of Llandaff and Seneschal of Llandaff Cathedral, and one of the ten Great Barons of Glamorgan, a Marcher Lord. After saving the life of Edward IV at the Battle of Towton in 1461, he was appointed Grand Standard Bearer of England, and the King granted him the use of "Towton" on the Mathew family arms.
 John Marshall (bishop), Bishop of Llandaff (1478–1496)
 Miles Salley, Bishop of Llandaff (1500–1516 or 1517)
 Hugh Lloyd (bishop), Bishop of Llandaff (1660–1667)
 Francis Davies, Bishop of Llandaff (1667–1675)
 Edward Copleston, Bishop of Llandaff (1828–1849)
 Alfred Ollivant, Bishop of Llandaff (1849–1882)

See also
 List of cathedrals in Wales
 Dean of Llandaff – Chronological list of deans of Llandaff cathedral
 List of works by George Pace
 List of tallest buildings and structures in Cardiff
 Listed buildings in Cardiff

Notes

References

Sources

External links

 
 Artwork at Llandaff Cathedral
 Parabolic arches used

Landmarks in Cardiff
Anglican cathedrals in Wales
Pre-Reformation Roman Catholic cathedrals
Grade I listed churches in Cardiff
Grade I listed cathedrals in Wales
Llandaff
Anglo-Catholic church buildings in Wales